Shinsaku Tsukawaki (3 January 1931 – 15 September 1993) was a Japanese gymnast who competed in the 1956 Summer Olympics.

References

1931 births
1993 deaths
Japanese male artistic gymnasts
Olympic gymnasts of Japan
Gymnasts at the 1956 Summer Olympics
Olympic silver medalists for Japan
Olympic medalists in gymnastics
Medalists at the 1956 Summer Olympics
20th-century Japanese people